Arvense, a Latin adjective meaning in the fields, is the specific epithet of the following:
 Anemopaegma arvense, a medicinal plant native to Cerrado vegetation in Brazil
 Arvense (section), a section within the mushroom genus Agaricus
 Cerastium arvense, the field chickweed, a flowering plant species
 Cirsium arvense, a plant species native throughout Europe and northern Asia and widely introduced elsewhere
 Equisetum arvense, a herbaceous perennial plant, native throughout the arctic and temperate regions of the northern hemisphere
 Lithospermum arvense, a flowering plant of the family Boraginaceae
 Melampyrum arvense, an herbaceous flowering plant of the genus Melampyrum in the family Orobanchaceae
 Thlaspi arvense, the field penny-cress, a foetid Eurasian plant species naturalized throughout North America
 Trifolium arvense, the haresfoot clover, a clover species

See also
 Arvensis, a Latin word with the same meaning